Yuriy-Volodymyr Ostapovych Hereta (born 30 January 2004) is a professional Ukrainian footballer who plays as a goalkeeper for Rukh Lviv.

Career
Hereta is a product of Poshuk-Opir (first trainer Volodymyr Mandzynyak) and Karpaty (first trainer Vitaliy Ponomaryov) youth sportive school systems in his native Lviv.

After he spent six seasons in the Karpaty youth team and played in the Ukrainian Premier League Reserves, he signed a contract with Rukh Lviv in September 2020.

Hereta made his debut for FC Rukh as a second-half substitute against FC Zorya Luhansk on 25 October 2020 in the Ukrainian Premier League.

References

External links
 
 

2004 births
Living people
Sportspeople from Lviv
Ukrainian footballers
Ukraine youth international footballers
Association football goalkeepers
FC Karpaty Lviv players
FC Rukh Lviv players
Ukrainian Premier League players